"Bernice Bobs Her Hair" is a short story by F. Scott Fitzgerald. It was first published in May 1920 in the Saturday Evening Post. The original publication was illustrated by May Wilson Preston. The work later appeared in the September 1920 short story collection Flappers and Philosophers.

Fitzgerald's story follows the plight of a mixed-race Native American girl named Bernice from rural Eau Claire, Wisconsin, who visits her beautiful and sophisticated white cousin Marjorie in the city. In an attempt to be popular, Bernice announces she will bob her hair, but this announcement leads to unforeseen consequences.

Decades after its publication, literary critic Orville Prescott of The New York Times hailed the work in 1951 as a landmark story "that set social standards for a generation of young Americans, that revealed secrets of popularity and gave wonderful examples of what to say at a dinner table or on the dance floor."

Background 
The story was based on letters which a nineteen-year-old Fitzgerald sent to his fourteen-year-old sister Annabel. As she wished to make herself more socially appealing, he "attempted to refine her social skills, providing detailed instructions on popularity and improving her image." 

In 1915, Fitzgerald wrote her a voluminous 10-page letter which gave "advice on conversation, poise, carriage, dancing, expression, dress, and personality." Fitzgerald later used this letter for the basis of his 1919 story draft. The original text of the story was much longer, but Fitzgerald cut nearly 3,000 words and changed the ending to make the story more attractive to publishers.

Fitzgerald named the title character Bernice as a reference to Berenice II of Egypt. According to legend, Berenice sacrificed her most beloved possession—her tresses—to ensure victory in warfare. For this act, the gods bestowed upon her a great honor: they placed her tresses in the heavens as the constellation Coma Berenices.

Summary 

Bernice, a purportedly mixed-race girl from rural Eau Claire, Wisconsin, visits her beautiful and sophisticated cousin Marjorie Harvey for the month of August. At the Saturday-night dances, none of the handsome boys wish to dance with or speak to Bernice, and Marjorie feels that Bernice is a drag on her social life.

One evening, Bernice overhears a hurtful conversation between Marjorie and Marjorie's mother in which Marjorie comments that Bernice is socially hopeless. She ascribes Bernice's social awkwardness and conversational reticence to Bernice's supposed Native American ancestry. "I think it's that crazy Indian blood in Bernice," remarks Marjorie. "Maybe she's a reversion to type. Indian women all just sat round and never said anything." 

The next morning at breakfast, a distraught Bernice threatens to leave town but, when Marjorie is unfazed by her threats, Bernice relents. She reluctantly agrees to let Marjorie turn her into a society girl. Marjorie teaches Bernice how to hold interesting conversations, how to flirt with unattractive boys to make herself seem more desirable, and how to dance. At the next party, Bernice's best line is teasing the boys with the idea that she will soon bob her hair, and they will get to watch.

With her new coquettish demeanor, Bernice becomes popular with the boys in town, especially with nineteen-year-old Warren McIntyre. Warren, who lives across the street, has been in love with Marjorie since childhood but she consistently neglects him. When it becomes clear that Warren has shifted his romantic attentions from Marjorie to Bernice, a vindictive Marjorie sets about publicly humiliating Bernice by tricking her into going through with bobbing her hair.

Marjorie tells various boys that Bernice never intended to bob her hair and that it was merely a ploy to attract their attentions. To prove Marjorie wrong, Bernice consents to be taken to a barbershop by Warren, Marjorie, and a coterie of admirers. However, after the barber bobs Bernice's hair, the boys abruptly lose interest in her, and Bernice realizes that she was tricked by Marjorie.

Marjorie's mother points out that Bernice's flapper haircut will provoke a scandal at an upcoming party held in her and Marjorie's honor. Deciding it would be best to leave the town before the party the next day, Bernice packs her trunk in the middle of the night and plans to leave on the next train after midnight. Before she departs, Bernice sneaks into Marjorie's room and shears off her cousin's two luxurious braids while she sleeps.

Exiting the Harvey house, Bernice leaves with both her luggage and Marjorie's two severed braids. As she proceeds to the train station, she notices Warren's house across the street. On a sudden impulse, she hurls Marjorie's braids onto Warren's front porch and shouts, "Scalp the selfish thing!" Then, picking up her luggage, Bernice runs down the moonlit street to the train station to return to her rural hometown of Eau Claire.

Adaptations 

The short story has been adapted twice for television. In 1951, CBS adapted the story for a Starlight Theatre episode starring 26-year-old Julie Harris as Bernice, Mary Sinclair as Marjorie, and Jerry Paris as Otis. Anita Loos appeared in a cameo as herself.

The story was again made into a television production in 1976 for PBS for The American Short Story. It was directed by Joan Micklin Silver and starred 27-year-old Shelley Duvall as the teenage Bernice, Veronica Cartwright as Marjorie, and Bud Cort as Warren. The role of Draycott Deyo was played by Patrick Reynolds (then using the stage name Patrick Byrne) and Marjorie's mother was played by Polly Holliday.

The story was later converted into a one-act play by D.D. Brooke for The Dramatic Publishing Company. 

It was adapted into a 2015 musical by Adam Gwon and Julia Jordan.

The Irish pop group The Divine Comedy turned the story into a song on its 1993 album Liberation.

References

Notes

Citations

Bibliography

External links

 The Saturday Evening Post — "Bernice Bobs Her Hair" (HathiTrust)
 
 
 

Short stories by F. Scott Fitzgerald
1920 short stories
1920s short stories
Fiction about fashion
American short stories
Works originally published in The Saturday Evening Post
Works about Native Americans
Flappers